Eraser is a 1996 American action film directed by Chuck Russell and starring Arnold Schwarzenegger, Vanessa Williams, James Caan, James Coburn, and Robert Pastorelli.  The film follows a U.S. Marshal of WITSEC who protects a senior operative testifying about an illegal arms deal and is forced to fight his former allies when one of the players is revealed to be a mole inside WITSEC.

Eraser premiered in Hollywood on June 11, 1996 was released in the rest of the United States on June 21, 1996, and was a commercial success, grossing over $242 million against a budget of $100 million. It received mixed reviews from critics, but they praised Williams's and Schwarzenegger's performances, the action sequences and the visual effects. It was nominated for an Academy Award for Best Sound Effects Editing in 1997. It was also one of the first major films released on DVD, being part of the Japanese launch lineup of Warner Home Video's debut of the format on December 20, 1996.

A direct-to-video reboot of the film titled Eraser: Reborn starring Dominic Sherwood, was released on June 7, 2022.

Plot
John Kruger – a top U.S. Marshal for the Witness Security Protection Program (WITSEC) – specializes in "erasing" high-profile witnesses: faking their deaths and giving them new identities. After erasing mobster-turned-informant Johnny Casteleone and his wife, John is given a new assignment by his superior: to protect Lee Cullen, a senior executive at defense contractor Cyrez Corporation. Lee has alerted the FBI that Cyrez executives have secretly financed the creation of an advanced electromagnetic rifle, which they intend to sell on the black market.

During an FBI sting operation, Lee downloads data from the weapon's development onto two discs: one for the FBI and one for herself. Cyrez Vice President William Donohue detects Lee's intrusion and summons her for a meeting. After finding Lee's hidden camera, Donohue commits suicide. Lee delivers the disc but refuses John's offer to go into witness protection, believing the FBI was willing to sacrifice her to nail the conspirators. The FBI's disc is secretly replaced with a fake on the orders of Under Secretary of Defense Daniel Harper, the conspiracy's mastermind.

That night, Lee is attacked by mercenaries sent by Cyrez CEO Eugene Morehart. John rescues Lee and erases her, setting her up in a new identity and keeping her location a secret even from WITSEC. Meanwhile, several witnesses John had previously helped are being murdered due to someone in WITSEC leaking information. The agency is now transferring all protected witnesses to new locations. Accompanied by Marshals Calderon, Schiff, and new recruit Monroe, John helps his old mentor, Marshal Robert DeGuerin,  raid a cabin and rescue a witness from a team of assassins. DeGuerin discreetly murders the witness when she overhears one of her captors reveal that he is the mole.

Flying back to DC, DeGuerin drugs John, who manages to warn Lee before losing consciousness. The warning call is traced to New York City and DeGuerin kills Monroe with John's gun, framing him as the mole. Revealing he, Calderon, and Schiff are corrupt, DeGuerin explains that they are the go-betweens for a wealthy buyer who plans to purchase the rifle. John escapes from the plane to rescue Lee from the same mercenaries who tried to kill her before. John and Lee flee through the Central Park Zoo; John releases several alligators to trap and kill the mercenaries.

DeGuerin has John and Lee branded as fugitives. With help from Johnny, they infiltrate Cyrez Corporation and use Donohue's terminal to decrypt Lee's second disc. The disc reveals that a huge shipment of EM rifles has been stashed at the docks in Baltimore. The buyer is Russian Mafia boss Sergei Ivanovich Petrofsky, who plans to resell the weapons to terrorists. The company detects the intrusion, pinpoints their whereabouts, and remotely erases the disc; DeGuerin then kidnaps Lee and takes her to the docks as the shipment is being loaded onto Petrofsky's Russian-flagged freighter.

Johnny contacts his mobster cousin, Tony Two-Toes, who controls the docks; angered that he's being cut out of the deal, he has his men assist John. They kill Petrofsky, his henchmen, Calderon, and Schiff. In a struggle atop a shipping container, DeGuerin tries to shoot Lee, but John comes to her aid and destroys the pulley system on the container crane, dropping DeGuerin and the container to the ground and exposing the presence of the EM rifles. John secures DeGuerin, leaving him to be detained by the authorities. This proves John and Lee's innocence. Weeks later, DeGuerin, Harper, and Morehart are indicted for treason. However, it quickly becomes clear that without solid evidence, they will likely be acquitted in court. For their safety, John fakes his and Lee's deaths in an explosion. 

After being liberated, DeGuerin, Harper and Morehart leave in a limo that stops at a railroad crossing. The driver – a disguised Johnny – locks the doors and exits the vehicle. Seconds later, a massive freight train plows through the car, killing the three men in a staged accident.

Cast

Production

Development and casting
Director Chuck Russell and star Arnold Schwarzenegger were originally working on another project together when Eraser was brought to their attention. Russell was excited about the possibilities the film could bring between actor and the character: "I see Arnold the way a lot of people do – as a mythic, bigger-than-life character – and that's who Kruger is.  The character and the scenario are based firmly in reality, but I liked the mythic proportions of this man with a strong sense of duty, a strong sense of honor, who will literally do anything to protect a noble witness.  I was excited about doing a film that had heroic proportions." Producer Arnold Kopelson was also keen to cast Schwarzenegger in the role of "The Eraser", having talked with the actor about working on projects before. Vanessa Williams would be cast as the lead female character, Lee Cullen, the key witness Eraser must protect.  Williams came to the attention of the Kopelsons when Maria Shriver, the wife of Arnold Schwarzenegger, suggested her for the role. To play the character of DeGuerin (Kruger's mentor and the main sociopathic antagonist), the filmmakers wanted an actor who could "convey intelligence, skill and magnetism – a more mature version of the Kruger character", they would cast  James Caan in this role. Before Caan was officially cast, Jonathan Pryce was also considered for the role.  The screenplay was initially the work of Tony Puryear, who had a background in advertising and rap videos. Writers Walon Green and Michael S. Chernuchin had previously worked together on the television drama Law & Order. Extensive, uncredited rewrites were made by Frank Darabont and William Wisher Jr. (Terminator 2: Judgment Day). Additional rewrites were made by John Milius as a favor to Schwarzenegger.

Design
The "rail-gun" featured in the film as a key plot device, Schwarzenegger talks on the subject: "We paid a lot of attention to making the audience feel the danger of this weapon, that anyone can be outside of your house, looking right through the walls.  It really leaves you nowhere to hide," he explains.  "But, on top of that, we show the sophistication of the weapon in a lot of fun ways: you not only see through a building, you see a person's skeleton and even their heart beating inside.  There are some great visual effects there."

Filming
Eraser began principal photography in 1995 in New York City. Locations would include The Harlem Rail Yard in the South Bronx, Central Park's Sheep Meadow and Chinatown. Following shooting in New York production moved to Washington D.C. For the action sequence which takes place in the Reptile House of New York City Zoo, interiors were built on the soundstages of the Warner Bros. Studios in Burbank, California. The screenplay went through numerous drafts with some of the most prominent screenwriters in the business, with a great deal of uncredited script-doctoring work being done by Graham Yost and William Wisher.

Speaking about this scene, director Russell says: "These things are jigsaw puzzle pieces not only within shooting sequence but within each shot. You had elements that were live action, elements that were miniature, sometimes computer-generated, and they're all married together in the final processing." Some of the physical stunts were performed by Schwarzenegger himself. For the "aerial" stunt Arnold was required to fall  in vertical descent and perform a back flip in mid-flight. The shot took seven takes to get right. In the final film, Kruger appears to drop along the length of the fuselage and past the flaming engine of the jet thanks to inventive camera angles and special effects.

Post production
The original name of the Cyrez corporations was "Cyrex".  However, Cyrix, a microprocessor corporation and rival of Intel, protested.  The name was then changed digitally in any scenes where the name appeared in a fairly costly process for the time, and dialogue redubbed. Some instances of the "Cyrex" logo are still visible in the finished film.

Release

Home media
Eraser was released on VHS and LaserDisc on October 29, 1996.

Reception

Box office
Eraser had an opening weekend of $24.5 million in the United States during the summer season of 1996, staying ahead of The Hunchback of Notre Dame. The final US gross was $101.2 million and final worldwide gross was $242.3 million. Eraser was a commercial success in the Philippines, grossing more at the local box office than Twister, Mission: Impossible, and The Rock. The film also had the largest opening for a Warner Bros. film in Malaysia, holding that record for six years until 2002 when it was given to Harry Potter and the Chamber of Secrets.

Critical response
Based on 53 reviews collected by Rotten Tomatoes, the film has an overall approval rating of 42% and an average score of 5.1/10. The site's consensus reads: "Erasers shoot-'em-up action might show off some cutting edge weaponry, but its rote story is embarrassingly obsolete". On Metacritic, the film has a score of 56 out of 100 based on reviews from 18 critics, indicating "mixed or average reviews".

Audiences polled by CinemaScore gave the film an average grade of "A−" on an A+ to F scale.

A more positive review came from Roger Ebert, who gave the film 3 stars out of a possible 4. He wrote that there were so many plot holes that "it helps to have a short attention span", but that Eraser is nonetheless "actually good action fun, with spectacular stunts and special effects" and a spirited performance from Williams "running and jumping and fighting and shooting and kicking and screaming and being tied to chairs and smuggling computer discs and looking great."

Other media

Novelization
A novelization based on the film by Robert Tine titled Eraser, was released in 1996.

Video game
The PC video game Eraser - Turnabout was released as a follow up to the plot of the film.

Reboot

In September 2021, a sequel, which became a reboot of Eraser instead, was announced to be in development with Dominic Sherwood in the lead role. The film co-stars Jacky Lai, and the supporting cast includes McKinley Belcher III and Eddie Ramos. It was filmed secretly in mid-2021, for release through Warner Bros. Home Entertainment. The film was released theatrically in Germany on March 31, 2022, and on Digital, Blu-ray & DVD in United States on June 7, 2022. It is available for streaming on HBO Max in fall 2022.

See also

 List of American films of 1996
 Arnold Schwarzenegger filmography

References

External links

1996 films
1996 action films
1990s chase films
1990s English-language films
American action films
American chase films
Films set in Fairfax County, Virginia
Films about terrorism in the United States
Films about witness protection
Films directed by Chuck Russell
Films produced by Arnold Kopelson
Films scored by Alan Silvestri
Films set in California
Films set in New York City
Films set in Manhattan
Films set in Maryland
Films set in Queens, New York
Films set in Washington, D.C.
United States Marshals Service in fiction
Warner Bros. films
1990s American films